Phyllonorycter madagascariensis is a moth of the family Gracillariidae. It is known from Madagascar.

The forewings are very pale ochreous, golden and marked with two silvery white fascia. The hindwings are equally dark grey dorsally and ventrally. Adults are probably on wing in July and August.

The larvae feed on Dombeya spectabilis. They mine the leaves of their host plant. They mine from June to August. Early instars form a long narrow semi-transparent, curved gallery which terminates as an irregular, more or less rounded, blotch. Many mines can be found on a single leaf.

References

Moths described in 1949
madagascariensis
Moths of Madagascar